Mrs. Warren's Profession is a 1960 West German drama film directed by Ákos Ráthonyi and starring Lilli Palmer, O. E. Hasse and Johanna Matz. It is an adaptation of George Bernard Shaw's 1894 play Mrs. Warren's Profession.

Cast
 Lilli Palmer – Mrs. Kitty Warren
 O.E. Hasse – Sir George Crofts
 Johanna Matz – Vivie Warren
 Helmut Lohner – Frank Gardner
 Rudolf Vogel – Rev. Samuel Gardner
 Ernst Fritz Fürbringer – Praed
 Elisabeth Flickenschildt – Mother Warren
 Erni Mangold – Liz
 Christiane Nielsen – Manon
 Anneli Sauli – Mary

Notes

Bibliography
 Bergfelder, Tim & Bock, Hans-Michael. ''The Concise Cinegraph: Encyclopedia of German. Berghahn Books, 2009.

External links

1960 films
1960s historical drama films
German historical drama films
West German films
1960s German-language films
Films directed by Ákos Ráthonyi
German films based on plays
Films set in England
Films set in the 1890s
Films about prostitution in the United Kingdom
Films based on works by George Bernard Shaw
1960s German films